Ciglenik  may refer to:

 Ciglenik, Požega-Slavonia County, a village near Kutjevo, Croatia 
 Ciglenik, Brod-Posavina County, a village near Oriovac, Croatia